Marc Gicquel  (born 30 March 1977) is a former professional male tennis player from France.

Tennis career

Gicquel turned pro in 1999. He made his ATP Tour singles debut at the 2002 Open 13 tournament on hard courts in Marseilles, France. He was granted direct entry into the qualifying draw, which saw him defeat Johan Rousseaux 6–4, 6–4 and Cristiano Caratti 6–2, 7–6(10–8) in the first two rounds prior to being defeated in the third and final round by Renzo Furlan 3–6, 3–6. He would however be gifted a lucky loser entry when sixth seeded Roger Federer withdrew from the tournament. He faced wild card compatriot Nicolas Mahut in the first round and bettered him by a score of 6–4, 6–3 before falling to another Frenchman and eventual runner-up Nicolas Escude 1–6, 6–7(3–7). 

Gicquel made his ATP Tour doubles main draw debut when he received a wild card entry into the 2005 French Open alongside compatriot Nicolas Devilder. They would optimize the opportunity they were given and defeated first round opponents Jordan Kerr and Sebastian Prieto 4–6, 7–5. 11–9 prior to bowing out with a second round loss to sixth seeds Leander Paes and Nenad Zimonjic 1–6, 3–6. He would also be given a wild card entry into the mixed doubles draw alongside Sandrine Testud, and they won their first two matches including a second round upset of the number 3 seeded Zimbabwean siblings Cara Black and Wayne Black 6–3, 2–6. 6–3 before falling in the quarterfinals to Paul Hanley and Samantha Stosur 4–6, 1–6.

On November 6, 2006, he broke into the top 50 after reaching his first ATP Tour final in Lyon, where he was defeated by Richard Gasquet. On April 30, 2007, Gicquel broke into the top 40 after reaching the semifinals of Casablanca. He reached a career high ATP singles ranking of World No. 37 achieved on 8 September 2008. He also reached a career high ATP doubles ranking of World No. 38 achieved on 12 January 2009.

He defeated second seed Tommy Robredo at the 2007 Grand Prix de Tennis de Lyon in the first round, and beat Alejandro Falla in the semifinals to reach the Lyon final for the second year running. Gicquel's run, however, was halted by another Frenchman, Sébastien Grosjean.

One of Gicquel's most famous matches was against Nicolas Kiefer at the French Open in 2006. Kiefer won the first two sets 6–0, 6–1, but Gicquel won the next two 7–5, 6–3. Kiefer eventually won the fifth set 11–9 after Gicquel had already saved multiple match points.

Gicquel reached 33 singles finals throughout his career, resulting in 20 wins and 13 losses which includes an 0–3 record in ATP Tour finals and a 9–2 record in ATP Challenger Tour finals. Additionally, he reached 22 career doubles finals resulting in 11 wins and 11 losses which includes a 4–3 record in ATP Tour finals and a 4–3 in ATP Challenger Tour finals.

ATP Tour career finals

Singles: 3 (3 runner-ups)

Doubles: 7 (4 titles, 3 runner-ups)

ATP Challenger and ITF Futures finals

Singles: 30 (20–10)

Doubles: 15 (7–8)

Performance timelines

Singles

Doubles

Mixed doubles

Trivia
In a match during the 2007 Halle, Germany tournament, Gicquel was struck directly in the crotch by a 129 mph Benjamin Becker serve. He went on to beat Becker, but spent most of the night vomiting and in pain due to swelling and was forced to retire in his next match versus Jarkko Nieminen.

References

External links

 
 
 Yahoo! Sports profile for Marc Gicquel
 Gicquel world ranking history

1977 births
Living people
French male tennis players
Universiade medalists in tennis
Sportspeople from Tunis
Universiade bronze medalists for France

Medalists at the 1999 Summer Universiade